Al-Walīd ibn ʿUqba ibn Abī Muʿayṭ (died 680) was the governor of Kufa in 645/46–649/50 during the reign of his half-brother, Caliph Uthman.

During the reign of Uthman, he was being accused of drinking,  the legal punishment of whipping was carried out on him, and according to some accounts, with Ali's hand.

Life
Al-Walid was born in Mecca to father Uqba ibn Abi Mu'ayt of the Banu Umayya clan and mother Arwa bint Kurayz of the Banu Rabi'ah. Both of his parents belonged to clans from the Banu Abd Shams branch of the Quraysh tribe, which dominated Mecca. He was also a maternal half-brother of Uthman ibn Affan, a member of the Banu Umayya who went on to become caliph in 644. Like most Meccans at the time, his family was a polytheist and opposed Muhammad. His father died fighting against the latter at the Battle of Badr in 624. However, al-Walid converted to Islam after the Muslim conquest of Mecca in 630. He was charged by Muhammad with collecting the sadaqat (charitable tribute) from an Arab tribe known as the Banu Mustaliq.

During the rule of Caliph Umar, al-Walid was charged with collecting the sadaqat from the Banu Taghlib tribe in Upper Mesopotamia.

Later he involved during Muslim conquest of the Levant, when he was sent by Iyad ibn Ghanm to subdue the fortresses of the tribe of Rabi'a and Tanukhid in Jazira, in an attempt to relieve the Byzantine coalition pressures toward Emesa.

His uterine brother, Uthman, appointed him governor of Kufa in 645/46, but his behavior and wine consumption riled the pious Muslims of that city, compelling Uthman to recall him in 649/50. He fled to Upper Mesopotamia following Uthman's assassination in 656 and died in al-Raqqa in 680. His son Aban served as governor of Homs under Caliph Abd al-Malik.

References

Sources

680 deaths
Banu Umayya
Rashidun governors of Kufa
Sahabah hadith narrators